Graham Leishman (born 6 April 1968) is an English former professional footballer who played in the Football League for Mansfield Town.

References

1968 births
Living people
English footballers
Association football forwards
English Football League players
Mansfield Town F.C. players
Gateshead F.C. players
Gainsborough Trinity F.C. players
Atherton Laburnum Rovers F.C. players